Dorte Kjær (born 6 February 1964) is a retired female badminton player from Denmark.

European & Danish titles
Kjær won the gold medal at the 1988 and 1990 European Badminton Championships in women's doubles with Nettie Nielsen. She and Nettie Nielsen had already won the European juniors girls doubles title in 1981. In 1983 they became the Danish National ladies doubles champions for the first time. Together they won the Danish National Badminton Championships six times (1983, 1985, 1986, 1987, 1988 & 1990). Dorte Kjaer won another National ladies doubles title in 1991 with Lotte Olsen. She also won one National Danish mixed doubles title in 1990 with Henrik Svarrer. Dorte Kjaer first won a bronze medal at the 1980 European Badminton Championships with Anne Skovgaard. She won a silver medal in the mixed doubles at the 1981 European Junior Championships with Mark Christiansen in Edinburgh, Scotland.

Other International titles
Dorte Kjaer and Nettie Nielsen won a bronze medal in Women's doubles at the 1988 Summer Olympics in Seoul when badminton was an exhibition sport. Dorte Kjaer won the Nordic badminton Championships in Women's doubles in 1982, 1984, 1985, 1986, 1987 and 1988 with Nettie Nielsen and in 1989 with Lotte Olsen. She captured the Nordic mixed doubles title in 1984 with Jesper Helledie. 
With Nettie Nielsen she won the Scottish Open twice in 1985 & 1986 and with Lotte Olsen the Danish Open & German Open in 1990. With Henrik Svarrer she won the Carlton-Intersport-Cup in 1987 and the Chinese Taipei Open in 1989. She was a professional badminton player for approximately 10 years.

Achievements

Women's Doubles

World Badminton Grand Prix Finals 
Women's doubles

IBF World Grand Prix
The World Badminton Grand Prix sanctioned by International Badminton Federation (IBF) since 1983.

Women's doubles

Mixed doubles

References

External links
 
 
 

1964 births
Living people
Danish female badminton players
Olympic badminton players of Denmark
Badminton players at the 1988 Summer Olympics
People from Roskilde
Sportspeople from Region Zealand